Kouba Olanga is a sub-prefecture of bourkou  Region in Chad.

References 

Populated places in Chad